Hope Holiday (born Hope Jane Zee) is an American actress, perhaps best known for her role as Mrs. Margie MacDougall, Jack Lemmon's partner in self-pity on Christmas Eve night, in the Billy Wilder film The Apartment (1960).

Early years
Holiday was born in Brooklyn, New York, and was raised in Manhattan. Her father, a burlesque entertainer who was the son of Russian-Jewish immigrants, changed his name from Allen Zaslawsky to Allen Zee before his daughters were born. She attended Public School 117 in Jamaica, Queens, and then went to Forest Hills High School.

She dropped out of high school and sang at the Copacabana nightclub. Her father was also described by Ed Sullivan as a "Capitol Theater exec." Her mother, Doris, worked in the production department at radio station WHN in New York City. Her father at one time was night manager of WHN. She has an older sister, Judy, whose stage name was Judy Sinclair.

Name change
A column in the June 30, 1954, issue of the Brooklyn Eagle noted Zee's change of names: "At the Guy Lombardo extravaganza, 'Arabian Night,' the lassie that almost walked away with the show was Hope Holiday. Hope, before this show, used the name of Hope Zee ..." She later recalled:I had a featured role as the Teeny Weeny Genie and got to sing two songs. Before this show I had been billed as "Hope Zee," but since my father was a producer of the show along with Lombardo, he purposely changed my name in the program, as he didn't want audiences thinking there was any nepotism involved. I literally had no say in choosing my new name. Since he loved Judy Holliday, Daddy decided to call me "Hope Holiday" without the extra "L." I hated the name at first but ending up keeping it.

Career

Stage
Holiday has extensive Broadway musical comedy background, beginning with dancing in the chorus lines in Top Banana and Guys and Dolls. As Hope Zee, she also was understudy to Rose Marie in Top Banana, but when the star had to be gone for a week, Zee was laid off, and Audrey Meadows was hired to take over the part. In 1949, she played Fifi and was a member of the singing ensemble of Gentlemen Prefer Blondes. In the 1956 Broadway production of Li'l Abner,, Holiday was understudy for Mammy Yokum in addition to being a featured dancer.

Singing
In the early 1950s, Holiday (billed as Hope Zee) sang with Ralph Flanagan's orchestra. An August 4, 1950, newspaper column by Dorothy Kilgallen reported, "Hope Zee ... quit 'Gentlemen Prefer Blondes' last week to become vocalist with Ralph Flanagan's band ..."

Personal life
Holiday is the widow of actor Frank Marth. They were married April 9, 1967. Marth died in January 2014.

Selected filmography

Actress
 Li'l Abner (1959) .... Chorus Dancer (uncredited)
 The Apartment (1960) .... Mrs. Margie MacDougall
 The Ladies Man (1961) .... Miss Anxious
 Have Gun Will Travel (1961, TV Series) .... Big Red
 Irma la Douce (1963) .... Lolita
 The New Phil Silvers Show (1963, TV Series, Episode "The Son of Pygmalion,") .... Mildred Flitterman
 The Rounders (1965) .... Sister
 How to Seduce a Woman (1974) .... Mary
 The Hughes Mystery (1979)
 The Return of Mod Squad (1979, TV Movie) .... Willy
 The Last Reunion (1980) .... Sally the Singer
 Texas Lightning (1981) .... Mrs. Stover
 Raw Force (1982) .... Hazel Buck
 Killpoint (1984) .... Anita
 Low Blow (1986) .... School Head Mistress (uncredited)

Production & Casting
 Texas Lightning (1981; associate producer)
 Killpoint (1984; associate producer, casting director)
 Rage to Kill (1987; executive producer)
 Code Name Vengeance (1987; executive producer)
 Space Mutiny (1988; executive producer)

References

External links
 

Living people
Actresses from New York City
American film actresses
Film producers from New York (state)
American television actresses
American stage actresses
People from Brooklyn
20th-century American actresses
American women film producers
Forest Hills High School (New York) alumni
Jewish American actresses
21st-century American Jews
21st-century American women
Year of birth missing (living people)